The Cara Williams Show is an American situation comedy starring Cara Williams which centers on a married couple who try to conceal their marriage from their employer. Original episodes aired from September 23, 1964, until April 21, 1965 on CBS.

Cast
Cara Williams....Cara Bridges/Cara Wilton
Frank Aletter....Frank Bridges
Paul Reed...Damon Burkhardt
Reta Shaw....Mrs. Burkhardt
Jack Sheldon....Fletcher Kincaid
Jeanne Arnold....Mary Hammilmeyer
Audrey Christie....Agnes

Synopsis

Cara and Frank Bridges were both divorced and co-workers at Fenwick Diversified Industries, Inc. — where Cara is a file clerk and Frank holds a management position as an efficiency expert — when they met, fell in love, and secretly got married. Although Cara's boss, Mr. Burkhardt, finds the scatterbrained Cara indispensable because only she can find anything in her incredibly complicated filing system, Fenwick Industries strictly prohibits its employees from marrying one another, so to keep their jobs the newlyweds conceal their marriage from Mr. Burkhardt. As part of the subterfuge, Cara uses her maiden name, Cara Wilton, in the office, but the couple also has to conceal the fact that they live at the same address, leading to many complicated and amusing situations for the Bridges both at work and at home. Mary Hammilmeyer is Mr. Burkhardt′s secretary. Fletcher Kincaid is a jazz trumpeter who is Cara and Frank′s next-door neighbor and friend.

Cara eventually tells Mr. Burkhardt that she and Frank are married. She convinces him that married couples are keeping Fenwick Industries in business, and he lets Cara and Frank keep their jobs.

Production

Film and television actress Cara Williams had co-starred on television with Harry Morgan as Gladys Porter in the situation comedy Pete and Gladys from 1960 to 1962 and impressed CBS executives with her comic timing. Touting her as the next wacky redhead in the mold of Lucille Ball — a November 1964 TV Guide article described her as having a "feminine" comedy style like Ball′s that contrasted with the “masculine mannerisms” of Carol Burnett and Martha Raye, although Williams did not acknowledge any similarity to Ball — CBS returned her to prime-time television to star in her own show, the eponymous The Cara Williams Show, for the 1964–1965 season. In depicting a previously divorced, childless, two-income married couple, the show was ahead of its time when it premiered in September 1964.

Keefe Brasselle created and developed The Cara Williams Show and co-produced it with Phil Sharpe. Kenyon Hopkins wrote the show's theme song, "Cara's Theme."

Broadcast history

The Cara Williams Show ran for a single season, airing on Wednesdays at 9:30 p.m. throughout its original September 1964–April 1965 run. Prime-time reruns of the show were broadcast on Fridays at 8:30 p.m. beginning in May 1965, the last of them airing on September 10, 1965.

Episodes
Sources

References

External links
The Cara Williams Show 60-second promo on YouTube
The Cara Williams Show opening credits on YouTube
The Cara Williams Show closing credits on YouTube
The Cara Williams Show episode "Will Cara's Success Spoil Frank Bridges?" on YouTube

1960s American sitcoms
1964 American television series debuts
1965 American television series endings
Black-and-white American television shows
CBS original programming
Television series about marriage
Television shows set in the United States